The qualification for the 2003 UEFA Women's Under-19 Championship were a series of association football matches between national teams to determine the participants of the 2003 Final Tournament held in Germany.

First round
Germany qualified as hosts, while Norway, Spain, France, Italy, Czech Republic, Sweden, Denmark and Netherlands received byes to the second round. The remaining 28 teams were divided into 7 groups of four teams, with each group being contested as a mini-tournament, hosted by one of the group's teams. After all matches have been played, the 7 group winners and best runners-up advanced to the second round.

Group 1

Group 2

Group 3

Group 4

Group 5

Group 6
Group matches were due to be held in Israel, but were moved to Albena, Bulgaria, because of the ongoing security situation in Israel.

Group 7

Ranking of second-placed teams
To determine the best second-placed teams from the qualifying round, all the results of the second-placed teams were taken into account.

The following criteria are applied to determine the rankings:
higher number of points obtained in these matches
superior goal difference from these matches
higher number of goals scored in these matches
fair play conduct of the teams in all group matches in the second qualifying round
drawing of lots

Second round
The 16 teams were drawn into four groups of four. The teams then played each other once. After that the group winners and the best three runners-up advanced to the final tournament.

The draw was held on 5 November 2002 in Nyon.

Group 1

Group 2

Group 3

Group 4

Ranking of second-placed teams
To determine the best second-placed team from the qualifying round, all of the results of the second-placed teams were taken into account.

References

External links
UEFA.com
RSSSF.com

Qualification
2003
Women's Under-19 Championship qualification
2002 in women's association football
2003 in women's association football
2003 in youth sport